Epidendrum fimbriatum is a terrestrial (sometimes epiphytic) orchid native to high altitudes (2.2—3.4 km) in Bolivia, Colombia, Ecuador, Peru, and Venezuela.

Description 
Epidendrum fimbriatum produces rather slender stems without any tendency to produce pseudobulbs covered from the base to the last regular leaf with close, tubular imbricating sheaths which, on the upper part of the stem, bear distichous leathery ovate-oblong  retuse leaves, up to 66 mm long by 6 mm wide. The apical inflorescence emerges from the last regular leaf uncovered by either sheath or spathe and terminates (usually) in a single congested raceme with floral bracts that can grow to nearly 1 cm long. The fleshy non-resupinate flowers are white to light rose with purple spots. The lanceolate to elliptic oblong sepals grow to nearly 6 mm long; the narrower petals are somewhat shorter.  The fimbriated, unlobed, somewhat pointed lip is adnate to the column to near its middle, as is more typical of the genus Prosthechea.

Homophony 
Epidendrum fimbriatum Vell. (1831) nom. illeg. is a synonym for the different orchid, Laelia gloriosa (Rchb.f.) L.O.Williams (1941).

References

External links 
Several pictures may be found at
 The Internet Orchid Species Photo Encyclopedia
 http://maqui.ucdavis.edu/Images/Orchids/epidendrum_fimbriatum.html
 http://www.orchidphotos.org/images/poe2009flowers/large-31.html 
 http://www.orchidphotos.org/images/orchids/POE2005/Fri/image023.htm 

Images of herbarium specimens may be found at
 http://orchid.unibas.ch/phpMyHerbarium/5137.3/1/Epidendrum/fimbriatum/Humboldt_Friedrich_Wilhelm_Heinrich_Ale_Bonpland_Aime_Jacques_Alexandre_Kunth_Karl_Sigismund/specimen.php

fimbriatum
Orchids of Bolivia
Orchids of Colombia
Orchids of Ecuador
Orchids of Peru
Orchids of Venezuela